Robby Müller, NSC, BVK, (4 April 1940 – 3 July 2018) was a Dutch cinematographer. Known for his use of natural light and minimalist imagery, Müller first gained recognition for his contributions to West German cinema through his acclaimed collaborations with Wim Wenders.

Through the course of his career, he worked closely with directors Jim Jarmusch, Peter Bogdanovich, Barbet Schroeder, and Lars Von Trier, the latter with whom he pioneered the use of digital cinematography. His work earned him numerous accolades and admiration from his peers. He died on 3 July 2018, aged 78, having suffered from vascular dementia for several years.

Life and work
Müller was born in Curaçao (at the time in the Netherlands Antilles) in 1940, and moved to Amsterdam in 1953. He studied at the Netherlands Film Academy from 1962 to 1964. He worked as cinematographer on a number of shorts before collaborating with Wim Wenders on his first feature, Summer in the City (1970). They made many more films together, such as Alice in the Cities (1974), Kings of the Road (1976), The American Friend (1977) and Paris, Texas (1984).

Apart from the movies with Wenders, Müller contributed to both mainstream U.S. productions and independent films. His other work included Joan Micklin Silver's Finnegan Begin Again (1984), the hazy, yellow-tinted cinematography of William Friedkin's To Live and Die in LA (1985), Sally Potter's The Tango Lesson (1997), Dom Rotheroe's My Brother Tom (2001), Lars von Trier's starkly shot films Breaking the Waves (1996) and Dancer in the Dark (2000), and Jim Jarmusch's gritty-looking films Down by Law (1986), Mystery Train (1989), Dead Man (1995) and Ghost Dog: The Way of the Samurai (1999).

He died on 3 July 2018 at the age of 78.

On 4 September 2018, the movie Living the Light - Robby Müller premiered at the Venice Film Festival. This documentary by Claire Pijman is a visual essay about the life and work of Robby Müller. On 4 October 2019, the documentary was awarded a Golden Calf for Best Long Documentary at the Netherlands Film Festival.

Filmography

References

Interview with Robby Muller (Dutch and English)
 

1940 births
2018 deaths
Golden Calf winners
Members of the Academy of Arts, Berlin
Dutch cinematographers
People from Willemstad
Deaths from vascular dementia
Deaths from dementia in the Netherlands